Raymond James Edwards, Jr. (born January 1, 1985) is a former American football defensive end. He was drafted by the Minnesota Vikings in the fourth round of the 2006 NFL Draft. He played college football at Purdue.

Early years
Edwards attended Woodward High School in Cincinnati and was a student and a letterman in football. In football, he was a two-year starter and posted 12.0 sacks, 110 tackles, and seven forced fumbles as a senior.

College career
Edwards played college football for three years at Big Ten school Purdue from 2003 to 2005.  In his college career, Edwards played 36 games (starting in 18).  He recorded a total of 16 sacks and received many honors including All-Freshmen team choice by The Sporting News (2003), honorable mention All-Big Ten (2004) and semifinalist for the Ted Hendricks Defensive End of the Year Award (2005).

Professional career

Minnesota Vikings
Edwards was drafted as the 127th pick (4th round) of the 2006 NFL draft. During his rookie season, he appeared in 15 of the 16 regular season games, (the most for a Vikings rookie that year) and started in 2 of the last 4 games.  He recorded 3 sacks and 10 tackles.  In 2007 Edwards had 5 sacks and 30 tackles in 12 games.  He scored one touchdown on a fumble recovery against Detroit.  On December 5, Edwards was suspended for four games by the National Football League for a violation of the league's Steroid policy.  He was not eligible to play for the remainder of the Vikings regular season. In 2008 Edwards made 55 tackles and 5 sacks as the starting left defensive end after the acquisition of Jared Allen. In 2009, Edwards had a breakout year, recording 8.5 sacks, and having a strong performance against the Dallas Cowboys in the Divisional Round of the post-season. Edwards became a restricted free agent in the 2010 offseason due to the CBA dispute instead of an unrestricted FA as he would have been if there were a labor agreement. The Vikings gave him a first-round restricted free agent tender. He signed the tender on June 14, 2010, after deciding to miss the Vikings offseason program.

Atlanta Falcons
On July 29, 2011, Edwards was signed by the Atlanta Falcons to a five-year contract for 30 million dollars with 11 million dollars guaranteed. During the Falcons' 8–1 start in 2012, Edwards was largely invisible, with most of his snaps being taken by players with much lower salaries.

Edwards was released by the Falcons on November 12, 2012.

Catfish
In a 2020 episode of Catfish: The TV Show, hosts Nev Schulman and Kamie Crawford discover that the catfish they are tracking down in the episode used Edwards photos in his fake Instagram account, along with two other men's photos.

Boxing
Edwards made his professional boxing debut at a Minnesota casino on May 20, 2011, defeating Tyrone Gibson in a four-round bout. Edwards told the Star Tribune that he had signed a two-fight contract. His trainer was Jeff Warner, a former heavyweight boxer and pro wrestler.

Professional boxing record

| style="text-align:center;" colspan="8"|12 Wins (7 knockouts, 5 decisions),  1 Losses, 1 Draws
|-
|align=center style="border-style: none none solid solid; background: #e3e3e3"|Res.
|align=center style="border-style: none none solid solid; background: #e3e3e3"|Record
|align=center style="border-style: none none solid solid; background: #e3e3e3"|Opponent
|align=center style="border-style: none none solid solid; background: #e3e3e3"|Type
|align=center style="border-style: none none solid solid; background: #e3e3e3"|Rd., Time
|align=center style="border-style: none none solid solid; background: #e3e3e3"|Date
|align=center style="border-style: none none solid solid; background: #e3e3e3"|Location
|align=center style="border-style: none none solid solid; background: #e3e3e3"|Notes
|-align=center
|Loss
|align=center|12-1-1||align=left| Keenan "Good Burger" Hickman
|
|
|
|align=left|
|align=left|
|-align=center
|Win
|align=center|12-0-1||align=left| Daniel Pasciolla
|
|
|
|align=left|
|align=left|
|-align=center
|Win
|align=center|11-0-1||align=left| Steven Tyner
|
|
|
|align=left|
|align=left|
|-align=center
|Draw
|align=center|10-0-1||align=left| Grover Young
|
|
|
|align=left|
|align=left|
|-align=center
|Win
|align=center|10-0-0||align=left| Efren "Doc" Brown
|
|
|
|align=left|
|align=left|
|-align=center
|Win
|align=center|9–0||align=left| Brandon "Sizzler" Spencer
|
|
|
|align=left|
|align=left|
|-align=center
|Win
|align=center|8–0||align=left| D. J. "Don't get me confused with DL" Hughley
|
|
|
|align=left|
|align=left|
|-align=center
|Win
|align=center|7–0||align=left| Sam "I Am" Coming
|
|
|
|align=left|
|align=left|
|-align=center
|Win
|align=center|6–0||align=left| Raymuendo Lopez
|
|
|
|align=left|
|align=left|
|-align=center
|Win
|align=center|5–0||align=left| Alex Rozman
|
|
|
|align=left|
|align=left|
|-align=center
|Win
|align=center|4–0||align=left| "Mini" Van Goodman
|
|
|
|align=left|
|align=left|
|-align=center
|Win
|align=center|3–0||align=left| Nick "Turbo Tax" Capes
|
|
|
|align=left|
|align=left|
|-align=center
|Win
|align=center|2–0||align=left|	Cory "Spare Tire" Briggs
|
| 
|
|align=left|
|align=left|
|-align=center
|Win
|align=center|1–0|| align=left| Tyrone Gibson
|
|
|
|align=left|
|align=left|

References

External links
Minnesota Vikings bio 

1985 births
Living people
Players of American football from Cincinnati
American football defensive ends
Purdue Boilermakers football players
Minnesota Vikings players
Atlanta Falcons players
American sportspeople in doping cases
Doping cases in American football
Woodward High School (Cincinnati, Ohio) alumni